Eugeniu Celeadnic (born 9 October 1990) is a Moldovan football defender who plays for Romanian Liga III side Foresta Suceava.

International career
Celeadnic was called up to the senior Moldova squad for a UEFA Euro 2016 qualifier against Russia in October 2015.

Club statistics
Total matches played in Moldavian First League: 146 matches - 3 goal

References

External links

Profile at Moldova Sports

1990 births
Moldovan footballers
Living people
Association football defenders
Moldovan Super Liga players
FC Tiraspol players
FC Sfîntul Gheorghe players
FC Academia Chișinău players
FC Speranța Crihana Veche players
FC Milsami Orhei players
ACS Foresta Suceava players
Moldovan expatriate footballers
Moldovan expatriate sportspeople in Romania
Expatriate footballers in Romania